Kokabiel, also spelled Kôkabîêl, Kôkhabîêl, Kakabel, Kochbiel, Kokbiel, Kabaiel, or Kochab, considered the 'angel of the stars', is a fallen angel, the fourth mentioned of the 20 Watcher leaders of the 200 fallen angels in the Book of Enoch. His name is generally translated as "star of God", which is fitting since it has been said that Kokabiel taught constellations to his associates.

According to The Book of The Angel Raziel, Kokabiel is a holy angel; in other apocryphal lore, however, he is generally considered to be fallen.  Kokabiel is said to command an army of 365,000 spirits.

See also
List of angels in theology
Raziel
Tamiel

References

Watchers (angels)